Greece is a town in Monroe County, New York, United States. A suburb of Rochester, New York, it is the largest town by population in Monroe County, and the second-largest municipality by population in the county, behind only the City of Rochester. As of April, 2020, the town has a population of 96,926.

History 
The Town of Greece was established in 1822 from part of the Town of Gates and was previously called Northampton.  The name "Greece" was selected because of the contemporary struggle of Greece for independence from the Ottoman Empire.

Prior to European settlement, the area the town occupies was inhabited by the Algonquian and Iroquois.The first European to visit the area was the French explorer Rene-Robert Cavelier, who visited in 1669.  French and British soldiers passed through on multiple occasions during this time period as the two colonial powers struggled to control the region. European settlers began to arrive in the area in the late 1790s, after the land was formally purchased from the Seneca. 

In the 19th century, Greece was primarily a farming community. Much of the economic activity in the town centered on the port of Charlotte, located on the eastern edge of town at the mouth of the Genesee River. A number of summer cottages and hotels for Rochester residents were built along the coast of Lake Ontario, and connected to Charlotte and the city by the Grand View Beach Railway in 1891.

As the city of Rochester expanded, it annexed large portions of the town. Charlotte was annexed in 1915, and the industrial district of Kodak Park was annexed in 1918. After World War II, large numbers of factory workers and their families moved to Greece and the town transformed into a residential suburb.

According to the Morgan Quitno Awards, Greece was rated the ninth-overall-safest city in America and the sixth-safest city with a population of 75,000 to 99,999.

The William Payne House, Greece Memorial Hall, William Covert Cobblestone Farmhouse, and Our Mother of Sorrows Roman Catholic Church Complex are listed on the National Register of Historic Places.

Geography
Greece is located at 43o 14' N latitude, 077o 42' W longitude.

The town is in the northern part of Monroe County and borders the City of Rochester on the east, the Town of Gates on the south, the towns of Parma and Ogden on the west, and Lake Ontario on the north.  The town is a contiguous suburb of Rochester. 

Major highways in the town include NY 390 and the Lake Ontario State Parkway.

Demographics

As of the census of 2000, there were 94,141 people, 36,995 households, and 25,748 families residing in the town.  The population density was 1,985.0 people per square mile (766.4/km2).  There were 38,315 housing units at an average density of 807.9 per square mile (311.9/km2).  The racial makeup of the town was 93.37% White, 2.88% Black or African American, 0.24% Native American, 1.49% Asian, 0.03% Pacific Islander, 0.87% from other races, and 1.12% from two or more races. Hispanic or Latino of any race were 2.55% of the population.

There were 36,995 households, out of which 32.5% had children under the age of 18 living with them, 55.6% were married couples living together, 10.4% had a female householder with no husband present, and 30.4% were non-families. Of all households, 25.6% were made up of individuals, and 11.1% had someone living alone who was 65 years of age or older.  The average household size was 2.52 and the average family size was 3.05.

In the town, the population was spread out, with 25.0% under the age of 18, 7.0% from 18 to 24, 28.4% from 25 to 44, 24.2% from 45 to 64, and 15.3% who were 65 years of age or older.  The median age was 39 years. For every 100 females, there were 92.3 males.  For every 100 females age 18 and over, there were 88.1 males.

The median income for a household in the town was $48,355, and the median income for a family was $57,102. Males had a median income of $41,563 versus $29,864 for females. The per capita income for the town was $22,614.  About 3.6% of families and 4.8% of the population were below the poverty line, including 6.3% of those under age 18 and 5.5% of those age 65 or over.

Government

The town is governed by a town board consisting of a supervisor and four council members.  The supervisor is elected by all registered voters in the town, while council members are elected by and represent one of four wards.  Supervisors are elected for four-year terms, and by town law may not serve for more than twelve years consecutively, after which the individual is ineligible to serve for four years. Councilpersons are elected for two-year terms, and may serve for a maximum of ten consecutive years in that position.

The town board's practice of opening each meeting with a prayer, which started in 1999, was legally challenged in 2008, on the grounds that all prayers offered to open the meetings had, until that point, been Christian ones.

The United States District Court, Western District of New York, ruled in favor of the town in 2010, and the Second Circuit Court of Appeals reversed that decision in 2012, setting the stage for a 2014 decision by the Supreme Court of the United States which ruled in favor of the town (see Town of Greece v. Galloway).

The town is also represented in congress by three different representatives, the State Assembly Representative, State Senatorial Representative and the Congressional Representative.

The town's New York State Assembly Representative is Josh Jensen who was elected to serve the constituents of the 134th Assembly district in 2020. The districts in which he represents include the towns of Greece, Ogden and Parma in western Monroe County.

The town's New York State Senatorial Representative is Jeremy Cooney who was elected to represent the 56th senatorial district on November 3, 2020. The 56th senatorial district encompasses the Towns of Brighton, Clarkson, Gates, Greece, Hamlin, Parma, as well as parts of the City of Rochester, including Charlotte, Historic Maplewood and the University of Rochester.

Greece's United States Congressional Representative is Joseph Morelle who was elected to represent the 25th congressional district of New York on November 6, 2018. Replacing the late Representative Louise Slaughter, who served as the United States representative for the 25th congressional district of New York from 1987 until her death in early 2018. The 25th congressional district of New York comprises all of Monroe County except for the towns of Mendon, Rush, Hamlin, Wheatland, and one election district in the town of Clarkson.

Six of the 29 districts of the Monroe County Legislature include portions of Greece.

Education
There are three school districts serving the Town of Greece: the Greece Central School District, the Hilton Central School District and the Spencerport Central School District. 

There are twelve elementary schools, four middle schools, and four high schools in the Greece Central School District, educating approximately 13,000 students.  The post-elementary schools have Classical Greek names:  Arcadia, Athena (Middle/High, Odyssey Academy, and Olympia.  The school district's motto is "One Vision, One Team, One Greece."
Among the elementary schools, Brookside, Longridge, Paddy Hill, Pine Brook and West Ridge span K-5.

See also
1978 Holiday Inn fire

References

External links
  Town of Greece webpage

Rochester metropolitan area, New York
Geography of Rochester, New York
Towns in Monroe County, New York
1822 establishments in New York (state)
Populated places established in 1822